The 2008 United States presidential election in Florida took place on November 4, 2008, and was part of the 2008 United States presidential election. Voters chose 27 representatives, or electors to the Electoral College, who voted for president and vice president.

Florida was won by Democratic nominee Barack Obama by a 2.8% margin of victory, making it the first time since 1996 the state was won by a Democrat. Prior to the election, most news organizations considered this state a toss-up, or swing state, as it was heavily targeted by both campaigns. Despite the fact that polls showed John McCain in the lead throughout much of 2008, Obama took the momentum in the two months before Election Day. Obama ended up winning the state with 51 percent of the vote, including wins in four counties that George W. Bush won in 2004. Obama became the first Democrat to win a majority of Florida's popular vote since Jimmy Carter in 1976.

, this is the last election in which Flagler County and Volusia County voted for the Democratic candidate. This is also the most recent election that Florida trended more Democratic than the previous one.

Primary elections 
State-run primaries were held for the Democratic and Republican parties on January 29. The Green Party held its own primary on February 1.

Democratic primary 

*As awarded by the May 31, 2008, meeting of the Rules and Bylaws Committee (RBC).
**Subsequently, some Edwards delegates switched to Obama.

Republican primary 

McCain prevailed in Florida's Republican presidential primary.

* Candidate dropped out of the race prior to primary.

Green primary
As part of the 2008 Green Party presidential primaries, the Green Party held a mail-in primary in Florida on February 1.

Campaign
Republican George W. Bush of Texas carried Florida by a convincing margin of 5% in 2004 against Democrat John Kerry, a much greater margin than in 2000 when Bush controversially won the state's 25 electoral votes against Democrat Al Gore of Tennessee by 537 votes.

Early polls showed Barack Obama faring poorly in Florida. During the primary season, Barack Obama did not campaign there and argued against seating its delegates for the Democratic convention, unfavorable media attention. Moreover, Florida's demographics did not favor him. A haven for retirees, Florida lacked many of the younger voters who passionately supported the Democratic nominee. Thus, in early 2008, opinion polling showed Republican John McCain leading most polls, sometimes by double digits.

Near the end of September, however, when the financial crisis of 2007–2008 became a more potent election issue, Obama proceeded to take the lead in most of the polls. Florida was especially hard hit by the economic shock. It was a hotspot of new home building and suffered tremendously from the subprime lending collapse. In addition, the state was full of retirees depending on 401ks; these were badly hurt by the stock market's fall.

Predictions
16 news organizations made state-by-state predictions of the election. Here are their last predictions before election day:

Polling

The 3 poll averages showed McCain leading throughout most of the presidential election season, until the last month of October. The final 3 polls had Obama leading 49% to 48% with undecided voters to decide the election.

Fundraising
McCain raised $14,826,093. Obama raised $19,963,592.

Advertising and visits
Obama and his interest groups spent $36,990,591 in the state. McCain and his interest groups spent $17,133,501. The Democratic ticket visited the state 12 times to the Republicans' 11 times.

Analysis
Obama won the state and its 27 electoral votes on Election Day by a margin of about 2.82%. Obama held a consistent lead for most of the night as returns came in, but the networks avoided calling the state for Obama until the conservative northwestern portion, most of which is in the Central Time Zone, began reporting its returns.

According to exit polling, Obama's win in the state can be attributed to winning 96% of the African-American vote, 57% of Latino voters, and 52% among Independents.

Upset wins in the Orlando and Tampa Bay areas, where George W. Bush won in 2004, contributed to Obama's victory. In the former, Obama carried Orange County (which includes Orlando) by 19 points - the best margin for a Democratic candidate in 64 years. Before Al Gore and John Kerry narrowly won it, Orange County hadn't supported a Democratic presidential nominee since Franklin D. Roosevelt's last run for president in 1944. He also became the first Democrat to win Orlando in a presidential election since Roosevelt. Obama carried Osceola County, near Orlando, by a 20-point margin (Bush won it in 2004 52%-47%). His strong performance in Central Florida more than likely helped the Democrats flip two U.S. House seats in that region.

In the Tampa Bay region, Obama carried Hillsborough County, home to Tampa, by a 7-point margin. Obama also won Pinellas County, home to St. Petersburg, by a 53%-45% margin. Bush had narrowly carried the county by about 0.1% in 2004.

Like most Democratic candidates, Obama dominated South Florida, winning Miami-Dade, Broward and Palm Beach counties by comfortable margins. The vote from Miami-Dade came in very late in the evening, stopping the major networks from calling the state for Obama earlier in the evening. However, Obama maintained a lead of at least 125,000 votes from the moment polls closed in the state.

On the other hand, John McCain kept the state relatively close, losing by far less than his national average. In northern Florida, a Republican stronghold, McCain won the majority of counties by double-digit landslides. Along the panhandle, McCain routinely took over 70% of the vote. Obama won only a handful of counties - most home to major colleges. Moreover, McCain improved on George Bush's performance in large parts of northern Florida - something he achieved in very few other areas of the country. Obama's sole accomplishment involved Duval County (Jacksonville), where he narrowed George Bush's 61,580-vote victory to a far smaller 7,919 margin. In 2008, Duval County had only supported a Democrat for president once since 1952, when Jimmy Carter carried it in 1976.

In addition, McCain was able to do well along the I-4 corridor in central Florida. This heavily populated, "swingy" region often determines which candidate wins in Florida's statewide elections. In 2008, the Republican candidate won most counties, including heavily populated areas such as Brevard County. However, McCain's unexpectedly poor showing in Orlando, a city that had voted Republican in presidential elections from 1948 to 2004, severely hurt his position in central Florida.

Democrats also picked up two seats from Florida in the U.S. House of Representatives. Democrat Alan Grayson defeated incumbent Republican Ric Keller for Florida's 8th Congressional District seat while Democrat Suzanne Kosmas ousted incumbent Republican Tom Feeney for Florida's 24th Congressional District seat. Republicans, however, were successful at winning back Republican Mark Foley's old congressional seat in Florida's 16th Congressional District seat when Tom Rooney defeated Democratic incumbent Tim Mahoney by a comfortable margin. At the state level, Democrats picked up two seats in the Florida House of Representatives as well.

This also marked the first presidential election in history (and one of only two times to date) that Florida has voted Democratic while nearby Arkansas voted Republican.

Obama became the first ever Democrat to win the White House without carrying Dixie, Gilchrist, Hamilton or Sumter Counties, as well as the first to do so without carrying Levy County since James Buchanan in 1856, the first to do so without carrying Pasco County since John F. Kennedy in 1960, and the first to do so without carrying Glades, Madison, Hernando, Okeechobee, or Putnam Counties since Lyndon B. Johnson in 1964.

Results

By county

Counties that flipped from Republican to Democratic 
 Flagler (largest municipality: Palm Coast)
 Hillsborough (largest municipality: Tampa)
 Osceola (largest municipality: Kissimmee)
 Pinellas (largest municipality: St. Petersburg)

By congressional district
Despite the fact that Barack Obama won the state, John McCain carried 15 congressional districts in Florida, including two district occupied by Democrats. Obama carried 10 congressional districts, including two districts occupied by Republicans.

Electors

Technically the voters of Florida cast their ballots for electors: representatives to the Electoral College. Florida is allocated 27 electors because it has 25 congressional districts and 2 senators. All candidates who appear on the ballot or qualify to receive write-in votes must submit a list of 27 electors, who pledge to vote for their candidate and his or her running mate. Whoever wins the majority of votes in the state is awarded all 27 electoral votes. Their chosen electors then vote for president and vice president. Although electors are pledged to their candidate and running mate, they are not obligated to vote for them. An elector who votes for someone other than his or her candidate is known as a faithless elector.

The electors of each state and the District of Columbia met on December 15, 2008, to cast their votes for president and vice president. The Electoral College itself never meets as one body. Instead the electors from each state and the District of Columbia met in their respective capitols.

The following were the members of the Electoral College from the state. All 27 were pledged to Barack Obama and Joe Biden
 Wills Chip Arndt
 Wayne Bailey
 Fred Balsera
 Terrie Bradv
 Karl Flagg
 Joe Gibbons
 Janet Goen
 James Golden
 Chris Hand
 Marlon Hill
 Tony Hill
 Joan Joseph
 Allan Katz
 Gena Keebler
 Joan Lane
 Caren Lobo
 Rick Minor
 Jared Moskowitz
 Angela Rodante
 Frank Sanchez
 Juanita Scott
 Geraldine Thompson
 Karen Thurman
 Carmen Torres
 Kirk Wagar
 Enoch Williams
 Frederica Wilson

References

Florida
2008
2008 Florida elections